Aris or ARIS may refer to:

People
 Aris (surname)

Given name
 Aris Alexandrou, Greek writer
 Aris Brimanis, ice hockey player
 Aris Christofellis, Greek male soprano
 Aris Gavelas, Greek sprinter
 Aris Konstantinidis, Greek architect
 Aris Maliagros, Greek actor
 Aris Poulianos (born 1924), Greek anthropologist and archaeologist
 Aris Spiliotopoulos (born 1966), Greek politician
 Aris Tatarounis (born 1989), Greek basketball player
 Aris Velouchiotis (1905–1945), Greek guerrilla fighter in the 1940s
 Aris Xevghenis (born 1981), Greek footballer

Fictional characters
 Aris Kristatos, in the James Bond film For Your Eyes Only

Places
 A settlement in the Windhoek Rural constituency of Namibia
 Arış, Azerbaijan
 Aris, Bern, a village in the municipality of Reichenbach im Kandertal in the Swiss canton of Bern
 Aris, Messenia, a municipality in Greece, next to a river by the same name

Sports clubs
 A Greek sports club in Thessaloniki, Aris Thessaloniki:
 Aris F.C. (Thessaloniki), a football club
 Aris B.C., a basketball club
 Aris Volleyball Club, a volleyball club
 Aris Water Polo Club, a water polo club
 Aris Baseball Club, a baseball club
 Aris Thessaloniki Ice Hockey Club, an ice hockey club
 Aris Limassol, a Cypriot football club in Limassol
 FC Aris Bonnevoie was a football club, based in Luxembourg City
 South Springvale SC, an Australian semi-professional soccer club, nicknamed Aris

Other uses
 A common nickname for several common Greek given names, such as Aristotle, Aristides, Aristomenes, etc.
 Ares, god in Greek mythology; also a Greek given name
 Architecture of Integrated Information Systems (ARIS), a method for analyzing processes
 ARIS Express, a freeware software tool from IDS Scheer AG based on the Architecture of Integrated Information Systems concept
 Arris, an architectural term for a sharp edge
 Anti-Racism Information Service (ARIS THERMIS) in Geneva, Switzerland
 American Religious Identification Survey (ARIS)
 Advanced Research Instrumentation Ship, two radar ships (the H.H. Arnold and the H.S. Vandenberg) of the U.S. Air Force which replaced the USAS American Mariner
 Swiss Academic Spaceflight Initiative (German: Akademische Raumfahrt Initiative Schweiz), a research program at ETH Zurich, Switzerland
 Airis Computer Corporation, a defunct mail-order computer company

See also

 Arys (disambiguation)
 Aries (disambiguation)